Providence Township may refer to:

Iowa 
 Providence Township, Buena Vista County, Iowa
 Providence Township, Hardin County, Iowa

Minnesota 
 Providence Township, Lac qui Parle County, Minnesota

North Carolina 
 Providence Township, Pasquotank County, North Carolina, in Pasquotank County, North Carolina
 Providence Township, Randolph County, North Carolina, in Randolph County, North Carolina
 Providence Township, Rowan County, North Carolina

Ohio 
 Providence Township, Lucas County, Ohio

Pennsylvania 
 Providence Township, Bedford County, Pennsylvania
 Providence Township, Chester County, Pennsylvania
 Providence Township, Lancaster County, Pennsylvania
 Providence Township, Montgomery County, Pennsylvania

Township name disambiguation pages